Dryopteris dilatata, the broad buckler-fern, is a robust species of deciduous or semievergreen fern in the family Dryopteridaceae, native to Europe, particularly western and central Europe. In southern Europe, it is mostly found in mountainous regions. It is also found between the Black Sea and the Caspian Sea.

The Latin specific epithet dilatata means "spread out".

The species and the cultivars 'Crispa Whiteside' and 'Lepidota Cristata'
have gained the Royal Horticultural Society's Award of Garden Merit.

References

External links

dilatata
Ferns of Europe
Flora of Europe
Flora of the Caucasus